Raga (also called Raja) is a town in South Sudan.

Location 
The town is located in Raga County, Western Bahr el Ghazal, in the northwestern corner of South Sudan, near the International borders with the Republic of Sudan and the Central African Republic. The coordinates of Raga are: 8° 28' 12.00"N, 25° 40' 48.00"E (Latitude: 8.4700; Longitude: 25.6800).

Climate 
Köppen-Geiger climate classification system classifies its climate as tropical wet and dry (Aw).

Overview 
Raga is a small but growing town that straddles the Raga River. Life in Raga has been described by a native author, Naomi Baki, who was raised in Raga till she was forced to leave the city at the age of 14.

Population 
It is estimated that the population of Raga was 3,700 in 2010.

Transport 
From Raga, the main road north (B41) leads to Al Murrah in the Republic of Sudan. B41-South leads to Wau, South Sudan. Raga is also served by Raga Airport.

External links 
Location of Raga At Google Maps
Profile At Places-in-the-world.com
Firsthand Account of Visit To Raga, South Sudan

See also 
 Raja County
 Raga Airport
 Western Bahr el Ghazal
 Bahr el Ghazal

References 

Populated places in Western Bahr el Ghazal
Bahr el Ghazal